"Now That I Found You" is a song written by Paul Begaud, Vanessa Corish and J.D. Martin, and recorded by Canadian country music artist Terri Clark. It was released in April 1998 as the first single from her album How I Feel. On July 17, 1998, the song reached number one on the US Radio & Records chart, number 2 on the Canadian RPM Country Tracks chart in July 1998 and number 2 on the US Billboard Hot Country Singles & Tracks chart.

Awards
The song was awarded both Broadcast Music, Inc. and ASCAP performance awards.  BMI also awarded their songwriters the BMI Millionairs award for receiving one million spins.

Cover versions
The song was covered by Australian vocal group Human Nature on their 1999 album Counting Down and by Irish pop group Mytown on their 2000 self-titled album.

Critical reception
Deborah Evans Price, of Billboard magazine reviewed the song favorably, calling it "a pretty ballad that features a lovely romantic lyric and a sing-along chorus." She goes on to say that Clark "temporairly abandons the female honky-tonk stance to deliver a silky, warm vocal  performance on this gentle track."

Music video
The music video was directed by Steven Goldmann and premiered in April 1998.

Chart performance
"Now That I Found You" debuted at number 74 on the U.S. Billboard Hot Country Singles & Tracks for the week of April 4, 1998. It reached #1 on the Radio & Records chart making it a bone fide US #1 record.  The song also reached #2 on the US Hot Country Songs chart in July, 1998.

Year-end charts

References

1998 singles
Terri Clark songs
Song recordings produced by Keith Stegall
Mercury Records singles
Music videos directed by Steven Goldmann
1998 songs
Songs written by Paul Begaud
Songs written by J. D. Martin (songwriter)